Olga Polyakova (born 23 September 1980) is a Russian racewalker. She competed in the women's 20 kilometres walk at the 2000 Summer Olympics.

References

1980 births
Living people
Athletes (track and field) at the 2000 Summer Olympics
Russian female racewalkers
Olympic athletes of Russia
Place of birth missing (living people)
21st-century Russian women